Australia For Kids is a 1989 album by Don Spencer. This album was nominated for the ARIA Award for Best Children's Album in 1990.

Track listing
All songs written and arranged by Don Spencer and Alan Caswell.
 "Bob The Kelpie" - 2:36
 "Rain" - 3:00
 "Out The Back" - 2:49
 "Boomerang" - 2:48
 "Australia" - 2:44
 "She'll Be Right" - 3:45
 "ABC Of Australia" - 2:23
 "Didgeridoo" -  2:59
 "Captain Cook" - 3:05
 "Sunshine" - 2:15
 "Coo-oo-ee" - 3:20
 "Aussie Boys And Aussie Girls" - 2:30

Personnel
Allan Caswell - vocals
Mark Collins - banjo
Wayne Goodwin - fiddle, mandolin
Tony Hicks - drums
Marty Hill - tenor sax
Karen Johns - vocals
Bob Johnson - trombone
Dave Kimber - piano
Terry Murray - guitar
Bill O'Toole - click sticks, didgeridoo, Irish whistle
Phil Scorgie - bass
Danielle Spencer - vocals
Don Spencer - vocals, guitar

Certifications

References

Don Spencer albums
1989 albums